The 1984 College Football All-America team is composed of college football players who were selected as All-Americans by various organizations and writers that chose College Football All-America Teams in 1984. The National Collegiate Athletic Association (NCAA) recognizes five selectors as "official" for the 1984 season. They are: (1) the American Football Coaches Association (AFCA); (2) the Associated Press (AP) selected based on the votes of sports writers at AP newspapers; (3) the Football Writers Association of America (FWAA); (4) the United Press International (UPI) selected based on the votes of sports writers at UPI newspapers; and (5) the Walter Camp Football Foundation (WC).  Other selectors included Football News (FN), Gannett News Service (GNS), the Newspaper Enterprise Association (NEA), and The Sporting News (TSN).

Offense

Receivers 

 David Williams, Illinois (CFHOF) (AFCA, AP-1, FWAA, UPI-1, WC, GNS, NEA-1, TSN)
 Eddie Brown, Miami (Fla.) (AFCA, AP-1, UPI-2, NEA-1)
 Jerry Rice, Miss. Valley State (FWAA, GNS, NEA-1, TSN)
 Tracy Henderson, Iowa State (AP-2, FN-1, NEA-2)
 Gerard Phelan, Boston College (AP-2)
 Reggie Bynum, Oregon State (NEA-2)
 James Maness, TCU  (AP-3)
 Larry Ray Willis, Fresno State  (AP-3)

Tight ends 

 Jay Novacek, Wyoming  (CFHOF) (AFCA, UPI-1, NEA)
 Rob Bennett, West Virginia  (WC)
 Mark Bavaro, Notre Dame (AP-1)
 Carl Hilton, Houston (TSN)
 Jon Hayes, Iowa (GNS)
 Willie Smith, Miami (AP-2)
 Keli McGregor, Colorado State (UPI-2, NEA-2)
 Alan Andrews, Rutgers (AP-3)

Tackles 

 Bill Fralic, Pittsburgh  (CFHOF) (AFCA, AP-1, FWAA, UPI-1, WC, GNS, NEA-1, TSN)
 Lomas Brown, Florida (AFCA, AP-1, FWAA, UPI-2, WC, NEA-1, TSN)
 Ken Ruettgers, USC (GNS)
 Brian Jozwiak, West Virginia (AP-2)
 Jim Juriga, Illinois (UPI-2)
 Daren Gilbert, Cal State Fullerton (NEA-2)
 John Clay, Missouri (AP-3)
 Jeff Dellenbach, Wisconsin (AP-3)

Guards 

 Dan Lynch, Washington State (AP-1, FWAA, GNS, NEA-1)
 Jim Lachey, Ohio State (FWAA, UPI-1, GNS, NEA-2)
 Del Wilkes, South Carolina  (AFCA, AP-1, UPI-2, WC)
 Bill Mayo, Tennessee (AP-3, FN-1, UPI-1, WC)
 Lance Smith, LSU (AFCA, AP-2 [OT], UPI-1 [OT], NEA-2 [OT])
 Carlton Walker, Utah (AP-2, FWAA, NEA-1)
 Andrew Campbell, SMU (NEA-2, TSN)
 Harry Grimminger, Nebraska (AP-2, TSN)
 Larry Williams, Notre Dame (AP-3, UPI-2)

Centers 

 Mark Traynowicz, Nebraska (AFCA, AP-1, FWAA, UPI-1, WC, GNS, NEA-1)
 Kevin Glover, Maryland (GNS, TSN)
 Trevor Matich, BYU (AP-3, GNS)
 Brent Martin, Stanford (GNS)
 Mike Kelley, Notre Dame (GNS)
 Phil Bromley, Florida (AP-2)
 Kirk Lowdermilk, Ohio State (UPI-2)
 Gene Chilton, Texas (NEA-2)

Quarterbacks 

 Doug Flutie, Boston College  (CFHOF)  (AFCA, AP-1, FWAA, UPI-1, WC, GNS, NEA-1, TSN)
 Bernie Kosar, Miami (AP-2, NEA-2)
 Robbie Bosco, BYU (AP-3, UPI-2)

Running backs 

 Keith Byars, Ohio State  (AFCA, AP-1, FWAA, UPI-1, WC, GNS, NEA-1, TSN)
 Kenneth Davis, TCU  (AFCA, AP-1, FWAA, UPI-1, WC, GNS, NEA-1, TSN)
 Rueben Mayes, Washington State (AP-2, FWAA, UPI-1)
 Greg Allen, Florida State  (AP-3, UPI-2, WC, NEA-2)
 Johnnie Jones, Tennessee (AP-2)
 Curtis Adams, Central Michigan (UPI-2)
 Ethan Horton, North Carolina (AP-3, UPI-2)
 Dalton Hilliard, LSU (NEA-2)

Defense

Defensive ends 

 Ron Holmes, Washington (AFCA, AP-2, FWAA, UPI-1 [DT], WC, NEA-1)
 Bruce Smith, Virginia Tech (CFHOF) (AFCA, AP-1, FWAA, UPI-2 [DT], WC, GNS, NEA-1)
 Tim Green, Syracuse (AP-3 [DT], GNS, TSN)
 Leslie O'Neal, Oklahoma State (AP-1, UPI-2 [DT], GNS, NEA-2 [DT], TSN)
 Freddie Joe Nunn, Mississippi (Ole Miss) (UPI-1)
 Mike Gann, Notre Dame (UPI-2)
 Garin Veris, Stanford (UPI-2)

Defensive tackles 

 Tony Casillas, Oklahoma (CFHOF) (AFCA, AP-1 [MG], FWAA, UPI-2 [MG], GNS, NEA-1, TSN)
 Tony Degrate, Texas (AFCA, AP-2, FWAA, UPI-1, WC, NEA-2)
 Ray Childress, Texas A&M (AP-3, UPI-1 [DE], TSN)

Middle guards 

 William Perry, Clemson (AP-3, UPI-1, WC, GNS NEA-2)
 Tim Newton, Florida (AP-2)

Linebackers 

 Jack Del Rio, USC  (AFCA [DL], AP-1, FWAA, WC, NEA-1)
 Larry Station, Iowa (CFHOF) (AFCA, AP-1, UPI-1, WC, NEA-2)
 Gregg Carr, Auburn  (AFCA, AP-1, UPI-1, WC, NEA-2)
 Duane Bickett, USC (AP-3, FWAA, UPI-1, NEA-1, TSN)
 James Seawright, South Carolina (AP-1, FWAA, UPI-2, NEA-1)
 Cornelius Bennett, Alabama (CFHOF)  (GNS, TSN)
 Alonzo Johnson, Florida (AP-3, UPI-2, TSN)
 Marc Munford, Nebraska (GNS)
 Eric Wilson, Maryland (AP-2, NEA-1)
 Brian Bosworth, Oklahoma (CFHOF) (AP-2)
 Knox Culpepper, Georgia (AP-2)
 Willie Pless, Kansas (AP-2)
 Tim Meamber, Washington (AP-3, UPI-2, NEA-2)
 Fred Smalls, West Virginia (NEA-2)
 John Offerdahl, Western Michigan (AP-3)

Defensive backs 

 Jerry Gray, Texas (AFCA, AP-1, FWAA, UPI-1, WC, GNS, NEA-1, TSN)
 Tony Thurman, Boston College (AFCA, AP-1, UPI-1, WC, GNS)
 David Fulcher, Arizona State (AP-1, FWAA, GNS, NEA-1, TSN)
 Jeff Sanchez, Georgia (AFCA, AP-2, UPI-1, WC)
 Rod Brown, Oklahoma State (AFCA, AP-2, UPI-2, WC)
 Richard Johnson, Wisconsin (FWAA, NEA-1, TSN)
 Bret Clark, Nebraska (AP-2, FWAA, UPI-2, NEA-2, TSN)
 Kyle Morrell, BYU (AP-1, NEA-2)
 Lester Lyles, Virginia (AP-3, GNS)
 Issiac Holt, Alcorn State (NEA-1)
 Anthony Young, Temple (AP-2)
 Sean Thomas, TCU (UPI-2)
 Don Anderson, Purdue (NEA-2)
 John Hendy, Long Beach State (NEA-2)
 Jim Bowman, Central Michigan (AP-3)
 Paul Calhoun, Kentucky (AP-3)
 Nate Harris, Tulsa (AP-3)

Special teams

Kickers 

 Kevin Butler, Georgia (AFCA, AP-2, FWAA, UPI-1, WC, NEA-1)
 John Lee, UCLA (AP-1, UPI-2, GNS, NEA-2, TSN)
 Donald Igwebuike, Clemson (AP-3)

Punters 

 Ricky Anderson, Vanderbilt (AFCA, AP-1, FWAA, UPI-1, WC, NEA-1)
 Randall Cunningham, UNLV (AP-2, UPI-2, TSN)
 Dale Hatcher, Clemson (GNS)
 Tom Tupa, Ohio State (AP-3, NEA-2)

Returners 

 Willie Drewrey, West Virginia (TSN)

Key 

 Bold – Consensus All-American
 -1 – First-team selection
 -2 – Second-team selection
 -3 – Third-team selection
 CFHOF = College Football Hall of Fame inductee

Official selectors

 AFCA – American Football Coaches Association (AFCA), selected by the members of the AFCA for the Kodak All-America team
 AP – Associated Press
 FWAA – Football Writers Association of America
 UPI – United Press International
 WC – Walter Camp Football Foundation

Other selectors

 FN – Football News
 GNS – Gannett News Service
 NEA – Newspaper Enterprise Association
 TSN – The Sporting News

See also
 1984 All-Big Eight Conference football team
 1984 All-Big Ten Conference football team
 1984 All-Pacific-10 Conference football team
 1984 All-SEC football team

References 

All-America Team
College Football All-America Teams